Galloway Hall is a residence hall on the campus of Hendrix College in Conway, Arkansas.   It is a large Tudor Revival three story brick building, designed by architect Charles L. Thompson and built in 1913.  Its central portion has a gabled roof, with end pavilions that have hip roofs with gabled dormers, and stepped parapet gables, with limestone trim.  It is the oldest dormitory building on the campus.  It was named to honor Bishop Charles Betts Galloway.

The building was listed on the U.S. National Register of Historic Places in 1982.

See also
National Register of Historic Places listings in Faulkner County, Arkansas

References 

University and college buildings on the National Register of Historic Places in Arkansas
Tudor Revival architecture in Arkansas
Buildings and structures completed in 1913
Buildings and structures in Conway, Arkansas
1913 establishments in Arkansas
Hendrix College
National Register of Historic Places in Faulkner County, Arkansas